Milutin Sredojević (born 1 September 1969), simply known as Micho, is a Serbian football manager who currently serves as the head coach of the Uganda national football team. He was appointed on 27 July 2021 and signed a 3 year contract.

Playing career
Sredojević formerly played for Svoboda Ljubljana, Sinđelić Belgrade, Grafičar Belgrade, Zorka Subotica and Pionir Subotica. He operated as a defensive midfielder but was cut short by a recurring knee injury but he opted to cross to coaching to stay in the game of football.

Managerial career

SC Villa
Micho was still in his early 30s when he set off on his African adventure that started at Kampala club SC Villa, where the management got Him from one European competition through the legendary journalist, John Kevin Aliro who worked with the Radio France International
At Villa, Micho guided the club to 3 consecutive league titles (2001–2002, 2002–2003 and 2003–2004), but the 2001/2 season will forever remain memorable in the history books of Uganda's football as Villa won the league title with only one loss in 28 games, on top of being crowned the Uganda Cup (Kakungulu winners) Villa, was also league winners the following year and CECAFA Club victors after 17 years since Villa had last won the championships.

Saint-George SA
Micho signed a three-year contract with St. George on 19 July 2004 and He replaced a Dutch national
When he joined St. George and he guided them to 2004/2005, 2005/2006 and 2007/2008 to league success picking up 19 wins, 5 draws and no loss in 2007/2008 season. He was also voted best coach of the season for the third time after guiding the same team to league success in 2004/2005 and 2005/2006 season.

Orlando Pirates
On 14 June 2006, Sredojević was appointed as the new head coach of South African Premier Soccer League giants Orlando Pirates replacing Kosta Papić who resigned and joined Maritzburg United the Serbian had a relative success in continental club competitions guiding South African giants Orlando Pirates to the semi-finals of the African Champions League in 2006. Micho is remembered by giving teenage Senzo Meyiwa a debut against AmaZulu in a league match won 2–1 by The Bucs at Ellis Park on 8 November 2006.
Micho was at Orlando Pirates for 217days. On Tuesday 16 January 2007, Micho parted ways with Orlando Pirates.

Young Africans FC
Micho joined Young Africans FC in 2007 helped them win the league title

Saint-George SA
Returned to Saint-George SA in 2007 up to 2010. St. George lifted the aforementioned Midroc Ethiopia Millennium trophy on 1 June with Saladin Said with an incredible 21 goals became top scorer 2007–2008, in 2008-2009 won the Ethiopian Premier league, Ethiopian national cup trophy and Ethiopian Super cup. In 2009-2010 won again the Ethiopian Premier League, he guided saint George to CECAFA CLUB CHAMPIONSHIP KAGAME CUP finals 2010 IN Kigali Rwanda though APR FC won it by 2goals to 0 Malawian born striker, Chiukepo Msowoya, scored the first goal on the 92nd minute of extra-time and set the second goal for Victor Nyirenda to seal the victory on the 96th minute.

Al-Hilal Sudan
Sredojević took over Al-Hilal Omdurman in July 2010. He managed the team for two seasons in 2010 and 2011, where he won two league titles, reached the semi-finals of the CAF Confederation Cup in 2010 and semi-finals of the 2011 CAF Champions League where they lost to CS Sfaxien of Tunisia in penalty after 1–1 aggregate.

Rwanda
On 1 November 2011, Sredojević was unveiled as the new head coach of the Rwanda, Sredojević replaced Ghanaian SellasTetteh, who left the post two months ago after a 5–0 defeat to Ivory Coast in a 2012 African Nations Cup qualifier, He was chosen from a five-man shortlist that included Stephen Keshi, Ratomir Dujkovic, Patrice Neveu and Branko Smiljanic. Micho guided Rwanda to group stages of the 2014 FIFA world Cup qualifiers in Group H along with Algeria, Mali and Benin after winning 4–2 goal aggregate against Eritrea. He was fired on 17 April.

Uganda
He became manager of Uganda in May 2013 after defeating other 37 people who had applied for the post.
The appointment follows the sacking of Scotsman Robert ‘Bobby’ Williamson in April 2013, he signed a two-year contract well as Sam Timbe and Kefa Kisala were also announced as assistant coaches, while Fred Kajoba retained his position as goalkeepers’ coach. Sredojević's first assignment as Cranes coach was between Libya versus Uganda at Tripoli International Stadium and at the end of the match Libya defeated Uganda by 3 goals to 0 which were scored in the first half, in that game 6 of Cranes 22 players in Libya were debutantes and these were Herman Wasswa, Richard Kasagga, Israel Emuge, William Luwagga Kizito, Alex Kakuba and Ali Kimera.

CHAN 2014
In January 2014, coach Sedrojevic, invited him to be included in the Uganda |23 player team for the 2014 African Nations Championship. The team placed third in the group stage of the competition after beating Burkina Faso, drawing with Zimbabwe and losing to Morocco.
Uganda finished third in Group E with seven points in AFRICON 2015 qualifiers where by Togo leading Ghana second and Guinea at the bottom.

2015
On 1 April 2015 FUFA president Moses Magogo added Micho a 3 years contract after he registered 60 percent success in the matches he handled, Micho handled the Uganda Cranes in 35 matches registering 18 victories, 5 draws and 12 losses since 2013 to 2015.
On 26 October 2015 Micho guided back Uganda Cranes to 2016 CHAN Championship in Rwanda after beating hosts Sudan 2–0 goals were scored by Caesar Okhuti and Farouk Miya at the Khartoum National Stadium to qualify on a 4–0 goal aggregate, this was Uganda's third appearance at the CHAN finals after the tournaments in Sudan and South Africa in 2011 and 2014 respectively.
In CECAFA 2015 The Cranes topped Group B after winning against Burundi and Zanzibar before overcoming Malawi in the quarter finals. In the semifinals, Micho's side overcame the host nation, Ethiopia 5–3 following a goalless draw in normal time and the 30 extra added minutes. Micho won his first Cecafa title for Uganda in 2015 after beating Rwanda 1–0 in the final and the goal was scored by Caesar Okhuti in the 15th minute.
Under Micho's guidance The Cranes convincingly swept aside The Sparrow Hawks of Togo to progress to the group stages of the 2018 World Cup qualifiers in a resounding 4–0 aggregate win over Togo over two legs – 0–1 at the Stade de Kegue and other 3–0 in the return at Mandela National Stadium, Namboole was just enough to put Cranes in the group stages.

2016
At CHAN 2016 Uganda Cranes finished in the third position in group D, where Zambia led the group followed by Mali and Zimbabwe last. On 4 September 2016, Micho led the Uganda Cranes team to qualifications for the Africa Cup of Nations for the first time in 38 years. The Cranes finished the qualification round very strongly as Group D runners-up, behind west African side Burkina Faso who needed a late win over Botswana, with 13 points safe in the bag, Uganda finished as one of the two best group runners-up to finally progress to the elusive stage. The Africa Cup of Nations draw placed Egypt, Mali and Ghana in Uganda's Group D. on 7 January 2016 Uganda attained the best ever position on the FIFA rankings in the 62nd out of the 209 FIFA Member Associations. Micho guided Uganda after 38 year old jinx to qualify for the biggest continental football fiesta – the African Cup of Nations, Farouk Miya scored 1–0 against the Island nation, Comoros in the 35th minute. Micho takes credit for developing the goalkeeper Denis Onyango, who has just been named African Player of the Year based in Africa for 2016, having worked with him in his first spell in Uganda. In December 2016, Sredojević was among the nominees for the prestigious CAF Coach of the Year Award following his exploits in 2016. Uganda was voted as a national team of the year 2016 in CAF awards Sredojević has so far won 14 league titles in five different big clubs in the African continent.

2017
In February 2017, in the last days of the winter transfer period, coach Sredojević recommended Khalid Aucho to join Red Star Belgrade.

On Saturday, 29 July 2017 during a fully packed press conference held at Pine Hall, Kabira Country Club in Kampala, Sredojević confirmed the termination of the employment contract with Uganda football governing body which had occurred on Friday, 28 July 2017 at 8 p.m. due to non payment of salaries for several months.

Orlando Pirates
On Thursday 3 August 2017, Orlando Pirates FC officially announced the return of coach Sredojević to the South African top-flight football club following his departure from the Uganda Cranes. Sredojević replaced Kjell Jonevret who had resigned on Wednesday 2 August 2017.
Micho's first game as the manager of Orlando Pirates was against Chippa's United, Orlando Pirates won the match 1–0 which was scored by Thamsanqa Gabuza. Micho used the following line up in that game Wayne Sandilands as the goalkeeper, Gladwin Shitolo, Ntsikelelo Nyauza, Thabo Matlaba, Innocent Maela, Abbubaker Mobara, Thamsanqa Sangweni, Mpho Makola (Issa Sarr 84'), Thabo Qalinge, Musa Nyatama, (Luvuyo Memela 62'), Thamsanqa Gabuza (Tendai Ndoro 77')
During his first season in ABSA Premier League Micho led Orlando Pirates to a second-place finish on the Absa Premiership log, as well as qualifying the team for the CAF Champions League. While at Orlando Pirates he was in charge of 80 games across all competitions, winning 38, drawing 26, while losing 16 and on 16 August 2019 he retired as Orlando Pirates manager. It was later revealed that Micho resigned and left the country because he had been accused of rape.

Zamalek
On 17 August 2019, it was announced that Sredojević will be joining Zamalek SC as their new manager; he signed a one-year contract. His uncle Dušan Nenković had also coached Zamalek SC from 1985 to 1986.

On 2 December 2019, Zamalek announced that Sredojević has been sacked less than four months into his new job.

Zambia
On 3 February 2020, Sredojević was unveiled as the head coach of Zambia national team, where he signed a two-year contract.

On 17 July 2021, the Football Association of Zambia announced Sredojević had left his role via mutual consent.

Uganda
On 27 July 2021, he was announced as the new Head Coach of the Uganda national football team, he signed a 3 year contract.

Managerial statistics

Background
Sredojević studied history and geography, and he is grandson of WWI hero Mulitin; Prokuplje, an old Byzantine village is the place where Sredojević was born. Sredojević is a cousin brother to coach Aleksandar Janković.

Role models
Sredojević has huge respect for legendary role model coaches including Miljan Miljanić (former Yugoslavia, Real Madrid) and Tomislav Ivić, regarded as the father of zonal pressing in modern football. Sredojević is a great admirer of late Johan Cruyff, who he considers “fathers of modern coaching”.

Managerial honors

SC Villa
Ugandan Premier League: 3
 2002, 2003, 2004
Ugandan Cup: 1
 2002
CECAFA Clubs Cup: 1
 2003

Saint-George SA
Ethiopian Premier League: 5
 2005, 2006, 2008, 2009, 2010,
Ethiopian Super Cup: 2
 2005, 2009

Al-Hilal Omdurman
Sudan Premier League: 1
 2010
Sudan Cup: 1
 2011

Rwanda
CECAFA Cup
Runners-up (1): 2011

Uganda
CECAFA Cup: 1
 2015

Zamalek SC
 Egypt Cup: 2018–2019

Individual honors

SC Villa
 Best Uganda Super League Coach of the Year: 3
 2002, 2003, 2004

Saint-George SA
 Coach of the Year Ethiopian Premier League: 5

 2004/2005, 2005/2006, 2007/2008, 2008/2009, 2009/2010

Al-Hilal
 Coach of the Year Sudan Premier League: 1
 2010/2011
African Cup of Champions Clubs / CAF Champions League:
2011 – Semi-finals
African Cup Winners' Cup \ CAF Confederation Cup:
2010 – Semi-finals

Orlando Pirates
 Absa Premiership Month Award for January 2018

References

External links
Profile at Saint-George official website
 Milutin Sredojević Interview

1969 births
Living people
People from Prokuplje
Serbian footballers
Yugoslav footballers
Association football forwards
NK Olimpija Ljubljana (1945–2005) players
NK Svoboda Ljubljana players
FK Sinđelić Beograd players
RFK Grafičar Beograd players
Serbian football managers
FK Spartak Subotica managers
FK Hajduk Kula managers
Saint George S.C. managers
Orlando Pirates F.C. managers
Young Africans S.C. managers
Al-Hilal Club (Omdurman) managers
Rwanda national football team managers
Uganda national football team managers
Zamalek SC managers
Zambia national football team managers
Ethiopian Premier League managers
Premier Soccer League managers
Egyptian Premier League managers
2017 Africa Cup of Nations managers
Serbian expatriate football managers
Serbian expatriate sportspeople in Uganda
Serbian expatriate sportspeople in Ethiopia
Serbian expatriate sportspeople in South Africa
Serbian expatriate sportspeople in Tanzania
Serbian expatriate sportspeople in Sudan
Serbian expatriate sportspeople in Rwanda
Serbian expatriate sportspeople in Egypt
Serbian expatriate sportspeople in Zambia
Expatriate football managers in Uganda
Expatriate football managers in Ethiopia
Expatriate soccer managers in South Africa
Expatriate football managers in Tanzania
Expatriate football managers in Sudan
Expatriate football managers in Rwanda
Expatriate football managers in Egypt
Expatriate football managers in Zambia